The Great Britain women's national volleyball team is the team representing Great Britain in volleyball competitions. The Great Britain Volleyball programme team was resumed in 2006 following an agreement of the FIVB to permit the national teams of Scotland, Northern Ireland and England to compete together for the 2012 Summer Olympics and 2012 Summer Paralympics. After losing 0–3 to Russia, they got their first Olympic victory, beating Algeria 3–2, a team ranked 53 places above them.

Current roster

References

Women's volleyball in the United Kingdom
National women's volleyball teams
2012 establishments in the United Kingdom
2012 in British sport
Volleyball in the United Kingdom
Volleyball